Lukas Lang (born July 27, 1986) is a Czech-born German professional ice hockey goaltender. He is the son of former Czechoslovak international goaltender Karel Lang.

Playing career
Lang signed a one-year contract, after a successful season with Schwenninger Wild Wings of the 2nd Bundesliga, with Krefeld Pinguine on May 3, 2013.

After a stint as backup with Düsseldorfer EG in the 2014–15 season, Lang continued his journeyman career initially agreeing to terms with EV Landshut of the DEL2 before signing with EHC München of the DEL to a one-year contract on August 15, 2015.

References

External links

1986 births
Adler Mannheim players
Düsseldorfer EG players
German ice hockey goaltenders
Heilbronner EC players
Krefeld Pinguine players
Living people
EHC München players
Nürnberg Ice Tigers players
EV Regensburg players
Schwenninger Wild Wings players
Grizzlys Wolfsburg players
Czechoslovak emigrants to Germany
German people of Czech descent